Daniel John Bauer (born June 29, 1973) is an American statistician, professor, and director of the quantitative psychology program at the University of North Carolina, where he is also on the faculty at the Center for Developmental Science. He is known for rigorous methodological work on latent variable models and is a proponent of integrative data analysis, a meta-analytic technique that pools raw data across multiple independent studies.

Career
Bauer graduated from Trinity University in 1994 with a major in psychology, minors in mathematics and history, and a concentration in computer science. He was a research coordinator at the Baylor College of Medicine prior to graduate school.

He earned a PhD in developmental psychology from the University of North Carolina at Chapel Hill in 2000. He completed a postdoctoral fellowship in applied statistics at UNC's Odum Institute for Research in Social Science, whereupon he joined the quantitative and developmental psychology faculty at North Carolina State University. He returned to UNC in 2004 as an assistant professor in the L. L. Thurstone Psychometric Laboratory. In addition, during that year, he was elected to the Society of Multivariate Experimental Psychology and became a faculty associate at the Statistical and Applied Mathematical Sciences Institute, leading a group for multilevel latent variable models.

He was promoted to associate professor in 2008 and full professor in 2013.

Extramural service
Bauer serves on the editorial boards of Psychological Assessment, Psychological Methods, and the Journal of Educational and Behavioral Statistics. He is an editor of or reviewer for dozens of other journals.

In 2008, he cofounded the Curran–Bauer Analytics consulting firm with Patrick Curran, a colleague in the Thurstone Lab, and has taught numerous doctoral-level workshops in quantitative methods to social scientists worldwide. He was recognized by UNC in 2016 "for exceptional teaching of post-baccalaureate students."

Research
Bauer has published widely in factor analysis, multilevel modeling, latent growth curves, mixture models, latent class models, structural equation modeling, and item response theory. He has presented his work at numerous conferences and has been cited in the scholarly literature more than 10,000 times.

As the recipient of various grants from the National Institute of Mental Health, the National Institute on Drug Abuse, and the Eunice Kennedy Shriver National Institute of Child Health and Human Development, he conducts applied research in psychopathology and negative health behaviors such as adolescent substance use.

Selected publications
 Bauer, D.J. (2016). A more general model for testing measurement invariance and differential item functioning. Psychological Methods. Advance Online Publication: .
 Bauer, D.J., Gottfredson, N.C., Dean, D., & Zucker, R.A. (2013). Analyzing repeated measures data on individuals nested within groups: accounting for dynamic group effects. Psychological Methods, 18, 1–14. . 
 Bauer, D.J., Howard, A.L., Baldasaro, R.E., Curran, P.J., Hussong, A.M., Chassin, L., & Zucker, R.A. (2013). A trifactor model for integrating ratings across multiple informants. Psychological Methods, 18, 475–493. . 
 Bauer, D.J., Baldasaro, R. & Gottfredson, N.C. (2012). Diagnostic procedures for detecting nonlinear relationships between latent variables. Structural Equation Modeling, 19, 157–177. 
 Bauer, D.J. (2011). Evaluating individual differences in psychological processes. Current Directions in Psychological Science, 20, 115–118. 
 Bauer, D.J. & Sterba, S.K. (2011). Fitting multilevel models with ordinal outcomes: performance of alternative specifications and methods of estimation. Psychological Methods, 16, 373–390.  
 Bauer, D.J. & Reyes, H.L.M. (2010). Modeling variability in individual development: differences of degree or kind?. Child Development Perspectives, 4, 114–122. 
 Bauer, D.J. (2009). A note on comparing the estimates of models for cluster-correlated or longitudinal data with binary or ordinal outcomes. Psychometrika, 74, 97–105. 
 Bauer, D.J. & Cai, L. (2009). Consequences of unmodeled nonlinear effects in multilevel models. Journal of Educational and Behavioral Statistics, 34, 97–114. 
 Bauer, D.J. & Hussong, A.M (2009). Psychometric approaches for developing commensurate measures across independent studies: traditional and new models. Psychological Methods, 14, 101–125.  
 Bauer, D.J., Sterba, S.K. & Hallfors, D.D. (2008). Evaluating group-based interventions when control participants are ungrouped. Multivariate Behavioral Research, 43, 210–236.  
 Bauer, D.J. (2007). Observations on the use of growth mixture models in psychological research. Multivariate Behavioral Research, 42, 757-786. 
 Bauer, D.J., Preacher, K.J. & Gil, K.M. (2006). Conceptualizing and testing random indirect effects and moderated mediation in multilevel models: new procedures and recommendations. Psychological Methods, 11, 142–163. 
 Bauer, D.J. (2005). The role of nonlinear factor-to-indicator relationships in tests of measurement equivalence. Psychological Methods, 10, 305–316. 
 Bauer, D.J. (2005). A semiparametric approach to modeling nonlinear relations among latent variables. Structural Equation Modeling, 4, 513–535. 
 Bauer, D.J. & Curran, P.J. (2005). Probing interactions in fixed and multilevel regression: inferential and graphical techniques. Multivariate Behavioral Research, 40, 373–400. 
 Bauer, D.J. & Curran, P.J. (2004). The integration of continuous and discrete latent variable models: potential problems and promising opportunities. Psychological Methods, 9, 3-29. 
 Bauer, D.J. (2003). Estimating multilevel linear models as structural equation models. Journal of Educational and Behavioral Statistics, 28, 135–167. 
 Bauer, D.J. & Curran, P.J. (2003). Distributional assumptions of growth mixture models: Implications for over-extraction of latent trajectory classes. Psychological Methods, 8, 338–363. .

See also
 Patrick J. Curran

References

External links
 Daniel Bauer's curriculum vitae
 Daniel Bauer's website at the University of North Carolina

Living people
21st-century American psychologists
American statisticians
Trinity University (Texas) alumni
University of North Carolina at Chapel Hill faculty
1973 births
Quantitative psychologists